Hamidiyeh (also Romanized as Ḩamīdīyeh; also known as Malekābād (Persian: ملك اباد) and Mīlkābād) is a village in Khanuk Rural District, in the Central District of Zarand County, Kerman Province, Iran. At the 2006 census, its population was 883, in 207 families.

References 

Populated places in Zarand County